In Samoan mythology, Mafuie is the god of earthquakes. He dwells in the volcanic regions below the Earth, and has only one arm.

Mafuie was also the keeper of fire. Tiitii, a demigod, won the fire from him in a battle; thus, fire was brought to the people of Samoa.

See also
Mahuika

References

Nature gods
Samoan deities